Aloinopsis schooneesii is a species of flowering plant in the genus Aloinopsis, in the ice plant family Aizoaceae, native to the eastern Cape Provinces of South Africa. It has gained the Royal Horticultural Society's Award of Garden Merit.

References

schooneesii
Endemic flora of South Africa
Plants described in 1931
Taxa named by Louisa Bolus